The sinking of HMS Reindeer was one of the hardest-fought naval actions in the Anglo-American War of 1812. It took place on 28 June 1814. Reindeer was too badly damaged in the action to be salvaged so the Americans set her on fire.

Prelude
USS Wasp was one of a class of three heavy sloops of war designed by William Doughty. The sloop was commissioned in Portsmouth, New Hampshire, and sortied on 1 May 1814. The commander was Master Commandant Johnston Blakely, and the crew consisted of 173 hand-picked New Englanders. Blakely's orders were to raid British commerce in the mouth of the English Channel, following the spectacular though short-lived successes of  the previous year.

Over several weeks, Blakely captured seven merchant vessels. At daybreak on 28 June, while Wasp was chasing two more merchantmen, the brig-sloop Reindeer was seen bearing down from the windward. Reindeer had sailed from Plymouth a few days earlier with orders to hunt down Wasp.

Battle
Wasp was the heavier of the two vessels, mounting twenty-two 32-pounder carronades and two 12-pounder chase guns. Reindeer carried only eighteen 24-pounder carronades, although 32-pounders were the standard armament for brigs of the Cruizer class to which Reindeer belonged. Reindeer also mounted two 6-pounder bow chase guns, but the brig's boat carried a 12-pounder carronade, which Commander William Manners was to use effectively.

Although the sky was overcast, the wind was very light and more than half the day was gone before the two vessels were within range. As both vessels shortened sail, Reindeer was within  of Wasps quarter, where neither vessel could bring its broadside to bear. Over ten minutes, Manners fired five deliberate shots from his shifting boat carronade from this position. Eventually, Blakely turned downwind to bring his broadside to bear, and the two vessels exchanged broadsides while almost dead in the water.

After twenty minutes' firing, the two vessels came into contact, and some of the British crew tried to board Wasp but were beaten back. Commander Manners was mortally wounded but continued to urge on his crew until killed by a musket shot from Wasps rigging. The American boarding parties followed up the repulse of the British crew, and swarmed aboard Reindeer. Once they had driven the surviving British crew below, the British captain's clerk, almost the only surviving officer of any rank, surrendered.

Reindeer had suffered 25  killed, including her commander, and 42 men wounded, out of a total of 98 men and 20 boys. Out of 173 men and two boys in her complement, Wasp had two midshipman and nine seamen and marines killed and mortally wounded, and fifteen petty officers, seamen, and marines wounded severely and slightly.

Aftermath

The American victory could be ascribed almost entirely to superior weight of armament and numbers of crew. The casualties inflicted on both sides were almost in proportion to the odds.

Reindeer had been beaten into a wreck, and Blakely set it on fire before putting some of the wounded prisoners aboard a neutral ship and proceeding into Lorient. After the abdication of Napoleon I, France was officially neutral in the quarrel between Britain and the United States, although French sympathies were decidedly with the Americans. Blakely was forced to remain for seven weeks while making repairs, chiefly to the damaged masts, but protests by the British ambassador were thwarted or ignored.

When USS Wasp emerged from Lorient, she won further victories in the Channel before vanishing in the South Atlantic, probably falling victim to bad weather.

Notes

References

External links

 

Reindeer
Conflicts in 1814
1814 in the United Kingdom
Maritime incidents in 1814
19th-century history of the Royal Navy
June 1814 events
Military history of the English Channel